Mathias Claus is a German jazz pianist and composer.

Education 

Education as jazz pianist at Musikhochschule Hamburg, studies with 
Dieter Glawischnig, diploma with excellence in 1989. Further 
studies with Ray Santisi at the Berklee College of Music in 
Boston plus classical studies with Shigeko Takeya and others.

Career 

Mathias Claus started collaboration recordings with musicians of the 
young cyber jazzscene worldwide. He contributed as guest player on 
numerous artists' CDs worldwide, working with many artists such as 
Peggy Morris, Nigel Hitchcock, Laurence Cottle, Sue Maskaleris, 
Daniel Martina, Fillipo Bertacche and others. Later on he started 
playing live concerts with his global musicians organising common 
tours and concerts in Germany with American artists Peggy Morris, 
Eyran Katsenelenbogen, or Misha Steinhauer from Moscow.

In 2003 he gained international attention being interviewed by allaboutjazz.com 
 and awarded by Bundesfonds Soziokultur e.V. for his international 
collaboration activities.

After gaining a teaching faculty 2004 in Braunschweig he started a career 
as jazz solo pianist. Recently he performed with some of the leading 
German jazz solo pianists at the 1. Hamburger Jazz Solo Piano Summit on 
16 June 2007 for the NDR broadcast Hamburg  and shared stage 
with players like John Taylor and Eliane Elias and was piano sideman 
for American vocalists like Gayle Tufts, Peggy Morris and Rachel Gould.

Awards 
Grant from GEMA Germany; Süddeutscher Rundfunk broadcast Music Competition laureate with his jazz quartett; finalist of the international jazz competition Hoeillarts in 
Belgium.

His music accompanying an animation movie for children (by Axel Brötje) won the Adobe Design Achievement Award 2007 in San Francisco.

External links 
 Official Website

References 

1956 births
German jazz composers
Male jazz composers
Mainstream jazz pianists
Living people
Male pianists
21st-century pianists
21st-century German male musicians